The Brussels Business is a documentary film by Friedrich Moser and  Matthieu Lietaert about the lack of transparency and the influence of lobbyists on the decision-making process in Brussels, the European Union capital. It also underlines the instrumental role of the European Roundtable of Industrialists in the making of the European Single Market as well as the construction of the European Services Forum, a core actor in the structuration of the service industry lobbying in Brussels. The film has been very popular in Brussels and Austria and is going to be Screened in other European Union theaters.

The Brussels Business is produced by Steven Dhoedt and Friedrich Moser.

Prizes 
Best Pitch at The Bips (Best International Project Showcase) in the Crossmedia section at Sunny Side of the Doc 2010.

See also
 European Round Table of Industrialists

References

External links 
 http://www.thebrusselsbusiness.eu/
 

Documentary films about economics
Economy of the European Union
Documentary films about politics
2012 films
Films set in Brussels